Highway 4 is an Iraqi highway which extends from Kirkuk to As Sa'Diyah in Diyala.  It passes through Sulaymaniyah, Darbinadikhan  and Jalaulah.

Roads in Iraq